Carditidae is a family of marine bivalve clams of the order Carditida, which was long included in the Venerida. They are the type taxon of the superfamily Carditoidea.

Carditidae is a neglected and poorly classified family. It has six subfamilies recognised by the World Register of Marine Species, but the WoRMS has refrained from assigning contents to any family due to ambiguity and overlap in their definitions. Additionally, several genera have been or are still considered subgenera of other genera by some authors.

Genera
The genera of Carditidae recognised by the World Register of Marine Species  are:
Akardita La Perna, Brunetti & Della Bella, 2018
Arcturellina Chavan, 1951
 Bathycardita Iredale, 1924
 Beguina Röding, 1798
Cardiocardita Anton, 1838
 Cardita Bruguière, 1792
 Carditamera
 Carditellopsis Iredale, 1936
 Cardites Link, 1807
 Centrocardita Sacco, 1899
†Choniocardia Cossmann, 1904
†Claibornicardia Stenzel & Krause, 1957
 Coripia de Gregorio, 1885
 Cuna Hedley, 1902
 Cuna aupouri Powell, 1937
 Cuna carditelloides Suter, 1911
 Cuna compressidens Powell, 1933
 Cuna gibbosa Powell, 1937
 Cuna laqueus Finlay, 1927
 Cuna manawatawhia Powell, 1937
 Cuna mayi Powell, 1930
 Cuna mendica Dell, 1952
 Cuna mayi Powell, 1930
 Cuna otagoensis Powell, 1927
 Cyclocardia
 Glans Megerle von Mühlfeld, 1811
 Glyptoactis Stewart, 1930
 †Goosensia Cossmann, 1885
Hamacuna Cotton, 1931
 Lazariella Sacco, 1899
 Megacardita Sacco, 1899
 Milneria Dall, 1881
 †Miodomeris Chavan, 1936
 Miodontiscus Dall, 1903
 †Paraglans Chavan, 1941
 Pleuromeris
 Powellina Huber, 2010
 Pteromeris
 Purpurocardia Maxwell, 1969
 Strophocardia Olsson, 1961
 Thecalia H. Adams & A. Adams, 1857
†Tutcheria Cox, 1946 
 †Venericardia
 †Venericor Stewart, 1930
 Vimentum Iredale, 1925

Synonyms:

 Arcturella Chavan, 1941 is a junior synonym of Arcturellina. It is not to be confused with Arcturella Sars, 1879, which is a junior synonym of the isopod genus Astacilla.
 Azarella is a junior synonym of Beguina.
 Agaria, Cardiocardites [sic] and Divergidens are junior synonyms of Cardiocardita. 
 Actinobolus Mörch, 1853 is a junior synonym of Cardites. It is not to be confused with the rhinoceros beetle genus Actinobolus Westwood, 1842.
 Ceropsis Dall, 1871 is a junior synonym of Milneria. It should not be confused with the true weevil genus Ceropsis.
 Miodon Carpenter, 1863 is a junior synonym of Miodontiscus. It should not be confused with Miodon Duméril, 1859, which is a junior synonym of the mole viper genus Polemon.

Notes:

 In some classifications, Bathycardita is a subgenus of Cardiocardita.
 In some classifications, Centrocardita is a subgenus of Glans.
In some classifications, Claibornicardia is a subgenus of either Glyptoactis or Venericardia.
 In some classifications, Vimentum is a subgenus of Cyclocardia.
In some classifications prior to the 2000s, Carditella was included in Carditidae, but it has since been moved to Condylocardiidae, along with its former junior synonym/subgenus (now independent genus) Carditellona.
Increasingly in several 2010s classifications, the subgenus Venericardia (†Baluchicardia) Rutsch and Schenck 1943 is considered an independent genus.

Subfamilies

Chavan, 1969 
The original six-subfamily system was first proposed by Chavan in 1969, contain the following genera (some of which are now synonyms or classified in other families):

Carditamerinae Chavan, 1969

Carditesinae Chavan, 1969

 Baluchicardia
 Cardites
 Claibornicardia
 Glyptoactis
 Ludbrookia
 Paraglans
 Xenocardita

Carditinae Férussac, 1822

 Beguina
 Cardita
 Jesonia

Miodomeridinae Chavan, 1969

 Chavanella
 Coripia
 Miodomeris
 Pteromeris

Thecaliinae Dall, 1903

 Milneria
 Thecalia

Venericardiinae Chavan, 1969

 Leuroactis
 Megacardita
 Pacificor
 Trapezicardita
 Venericardia
 Venericor

Perez, 2019 
In 2019, D. E. Pérez proposed a seven-subfamily system for Carditidae.

Carditamerinae

 Carditamera
 Centrocardita
 Glans

Carditinae

 Beguina
 *Birkelundita
 Cardita

Miodomeridinae

 *Kolmeris
 Miodomeris
 Pteromeris

Palaeocarditinae  Chavan, 1969

 *Palaeocardita
 *Schizocardita

Scalaricarditinae Pérez, 2019

 Coripia
 *Scalaricardita
 Vimentum

Thecaliinae

 Powellina
 Thecalia

Venericardiinae

* = not yet recognised by the World Register of Marine Species.

In addition, Pérez proposed possible affiliations for the genera not included in his subfamilies:

 Carditidae: Carditomantea?
 Carditinae: Goosensia?
 Cyclocardida: Ainicardita, Crassicardia, Lunulicardita
 Eucarditidae: Pseudocardia? (some species)
 Miodomeridinae: Miodontiscus
 Scalaricarditinae: Malarossia, Akardita?, Choniocardia (could be Cyclocardida)
 Stem-Carditidae: Fenestricardita?, Trapezicardita?, Gujocardita? (could be Permophoridae), Septocardia? (could be Cardiidae)
 Stem-Eucarditidae or Stem-Carditida: Izumicardia 
 Venericardiini: Cossmannella, Cretocardia, Lazariella
 Venericardiinae: Cycloglans, Strophocardia, Maghrebella?, Subvenericardia?
 Uncertain: Milneria, Xenocardita

In some classifications prior to the 2000s, Carditidae used to contain a seventh subfamily Carditellinae, until it was reallocated to Condylocardiidae.

References 

  (1979): New Zealand Mollusca, William Collins Publishers Ltd, Auckland, New Zealand. 
  (2008): Psamathini. Version of 2008-MAR-26. Retrieved 2009-FEB-23.

 
Bivalve families
Taxa named by Jean-Baptiste Lamarck
Taxa described in 1822